|Ship image= «Александр Невский» в Вилючинске.jpg

The OK-650 reactor is the nuclear fission reactor used for powering the Soviet Navy's 
Project 685 Плавник/Plavnik (Mike), 
Project 971 Щука-Б/Shchuka-B (Akula), and 
Project 945 Барракуда/Barrakuda, Кондор/Kondor, and Марс/Mars (Sierra) submarines, and in pairs to power the 
Project 941 Акула/Akula (Typhoon) and 
Project 949 Гранит/Granit and Антей/Antei (Oscar) third generation submarines.  

K-550 Alexander Nevsky
This pressurized water reactor (PWR) uses 20-45% enriched uranium-235  fuel to produce 190 MW of thermal power. Developed during the 1970s, these reactors were designed with the aim of minimizing accidents and malfunctions. Monitoring subsystems, designed for rapid detection of leaks, were included, along with newer-generation emergency cooling systems for the main reactor core. The reactor is now also used to power the new Project 955 Borei submarines. It was developed by OKBM Afrikantov.

Versions

References

Soviet naval reactors
Pressurized water reactors